The 2014 Maryland House of Delegates elections were held on November 4, 2014, as part of the biennial United States elections. All 141 of Maryland's state delegates were up for reelection.

Retiring incumbents

Democrats 
 District 3A: Galen R. Clagett retired.
 District 6: Joseph J. Minnick retired.
 District 6: John A. Olszewski Jr. retired to run for state senator in District 6.
 District 10: Emmett C. Burns Jr. retired.
 District 10: Shirley Nathan-Pulliam retired to run for state senator in District 44.
 District 11: Jon Cardin retired to run for attorney general of Maryland.
 District 12A: Steven J. DeBoy Sr. retired.
 District 12A: James E. Malone Jr. retired.
 District 12B: Elizabeth Bobo retired.
 District 13: Guy Guzzone retired to run for state senator in District 13.
 District 16: Susan C. Lee retired to run for state senator in District 16.
 District 17: Luiz R. S. Simmons retired to run for state senator in District 17.
 District 19: Sam Arora retired.
 District 20: Heather Mizeur retired to run for governor of Maryland.
 District 20: Tom Hucker retired to run for the Montgomery County Council.
 District 23A: James W. Hubbard retired.
 District 25: Aisha Braveboy retired to run for Attorney General of Maryland.
 District 25: Melony G. Griffith retired to run for state senator in District 25.
 District 26: Veronica L. Turner retired to run for state senator in District 26.
 District 28: Peter Murphy retired to run for President of the Charles County Board of Commissioners.
 District 29B: John F. Wood Jr. retired.
 District 32: Mary Ann Love retired.
 District 34A: Mary-Dulany James retired to run for state senator in District 34.
 District 37: Rudolph C. Cane retired.
 District 45: Nina R. Harper retired.
 District 46: Brian K. McHale retired.
 District 47: Jolene Ivey retired to run for lieutenant governor of Maryland.
 District 47: Doyle Niemann retired to run for the Prince George's County Council.

Republicans
 District 1C: LeRoy E. Myers Jr. retired to run for Washington County Commissioner.
 District 3A: Patrick N. Hogan retired.
 District 3B: Michael Hough retired to run for state senator in District 4.
 District 9A: Gail H. Bates retired to run for state senator in District 9.
 District 30: Ron George retired to run for governor of Maryland.
 District 31: Steve Schuh retired to run for Anne Arundel County Executive.
 District 33: Robert A. Costa retired.
 District 35A: H. Wayne Norman Jr. retired to run for state senator in District 35.
 District 35A: Donna Stifler retired.
 District 37B: Adelaide C. Eckardt retired to run for state senator in District 37.
 District 37B: Jeannie Haddaway retired to run for lieutenant governor of Maryland.
 District 42: William J. Frank retired.

Incumbents defeated

In primaries

Democrats
 District 24: Darren Swain lost renomination to Erek Barron, Carolyn J. B. Howard, and Michael L. Vaughn.
 District 40: Shawn Z. Tarrant lost renomination to Antonio Hayes, Frank M. Conaway Jr., and Barbara A. Robinson.
 District 44A: Melvin L. Stukes lost renomination to Keith E. Haynes.
 District 44A: Keiffer Mitchell Jr. lost renomination to Keith E. Haynes.
 District 47: Michael G. Summers lost renomination to Diana M. Fennell.

Republicans
 District 4B: Donald B. Elliott lost renomination to Haven Shoemaker, Justin Ready, and Susan W. Krebs.
 District 31: Don H. Dwyer Jr. lost renomination to Meagan Simonaire.
 District 36: Michael D. Smigiel Sr. lost renomination to Jefferson L. Ghrist, Jay Jacobs, and Steven J. Arentz.
 District 42B: Joseph C. Boteler III lost renomination to Susan L. M. Aumann and Chris West.

In the general election

Democrats
 District 1B: Kevin Kelly lost to Jason C. Buckel.
 District 2B: John P. Donoghue lost to Brett Wilson.
 District 6: Michael H. Weir Jr. lost to Robin Grammer Jr., Robert B. Long, and Ric Metzgar.
 District 29B: John L. Bohanan Jr. lost to Deb Rey.
 District 34B: David D. Rudolph lost to Kevin Hornberger.
 District 38B: Norman Conway lost to Carl Anderton Jr.

List of districts

All election results are from the Maryland State Board of Elections.

District 1A

District 1B

District 1C

District 2A

District 2B

District 3A

District 3B

District 4

District 5

District 6

District 7

District 8

District 9A

District 9B

District 10

District 11

District 12

District 13

District 14

District 15

District 16

District 17

District 18

District 19

District 20

District 21

District 22

District 23A

District 23B

District 24

District 25

District 26

District 27A

District 27B

District 27C

District 28

District 29A

District 29B

District 29C

District 30A

District 30B

District 31A

District 31B

District 32

District 33

District 34A

District 34B

District 35A

District 35B

District 36

District 37A

District 37B

District 38A

District 38B

District 38C

District 39

District 40

District 41

District 42A

District 42B

District 43

District 44A

District 44B

District 45

District 46

District 47A

District 47B

References

House of Delegates
Maryland House of Delegates
Maryland House of Delegates elections